Val Howell (died 25 January 2021) was a Welsh international lawn bowler.

Bowls career
Howell was part of the fours Welsh team that competed at the 1994 Commonwealth Games in Victoria.

In 1993, she won the triples gold medal and the fours silver medal at the inaugural Atlantic Bowls Championships.

She became a Welsh champion in 1986 winning the triples at the Welsh National Bowls Championships.

She later became the Welsh team manager.

References 

Welsh female bowls players
Year of birth missing
2021 deaths
Bowls players at the 1994 Commonwealth Games